Winnie is a census-designated place (CDP) in Chambers County, Texas, United States. The population was 3,162 at the 2020 census.

History
The town plat was filed in 1895 by the Gulf and Inter-state Railway officials. The town was named after Fox Winnie, a railroad contractor who worked for the line. The Winnie and Loan Improvement Company attempted to market small lots of land, but due to poor sales, the company was dissolved in 1911. In 1941 an oilfield was discovered nearby, leading the way for the oil businessman Glenn H. McCarthy to establish a gas plant just east of the town. This development, along with the construction of Interstate 10, would lead to a population growth. The East Chambers County Consolidated School District was established in 1931.

Geography
Winnie is located at  (29.818891, -94.383462).

Demographics

As of the 2020 United States census, there were 3,162 people, 926 households, and 598 families residing in the CDP.

2000 Census data
As of the census of 2000, there were 2,914 people, 1,039 households, and 735 families residing in the CDP. The population density was 732.9 people per square mile (282.7/km2). There were 1,160 housing units at an average density of 291.8 per square mile (112.5/km2). The racial makeup of the CDP was 87.27% White, 5.32% African American, 0.72% Native American, 0.27% Asian, 5.56% from other races, and 0.86% from two or more races. Hispanic or Latino of any race were 10.12% of the population.

There were 1,039 households, out of which 36.0% had children under the age of 18 living with them, 55.1% were married couples living together, 10.9% had a female householder with no husband present, and 29.2% were non-families. 24.6% of all households were made up of individuals, and 10.7% had someone living alone who was 65 years of age or older. The average household size was 2.64 and the average family size was 3.16.

In the CDP, the population was 27.4% under the age of 18, 8.8% from 18 to 24, 28.8% from 25 to 44, 20.9% from 45 to 64, and 14.2% who were 65 years of age or older. The median age was 36 years. For every 100 females, there were 101.8 males. For every 100 females age 18 and over, there were 99.2 males. The median income for a household in the CDP was $31,314, and the median income for a family was $33,816. Males had a median income of $31,083 versus $17,708 for females. The per capita income for the CDP was $13,779. About 10.7% of families and 14.3% of the population were below the poverty line, including 21.0% of those under age 18 and 6.8% of those aged 65 or over.

Arts and culture
Winnie is the host of the Texas Rice Festival (TRF), which occurs during the first weekend of October annually. During the TRF, the farmers of Southeast Texas are appreciated, and there are live bands, singers, and a Beauty Pageant that takes place during this time. It starts on the Wednesday before the first weekend of October by a cook-off festival.

During the first weekend of every month, there is a flea market entitled Larry's Old Time Trade Days. This is a cultural attraction for much of Southeast Texas.

Area attractions

Education

East Chambers Independent School District serves Winnie.
The Juanita Hargraves Memorial Branch Library in Winnie is a branch of the Chambers County Library System.

Residents of East Chambers ISD are zoned to Lee College.

Transportation
Chambers County-Winnie Stowell Airport, a general aviation airport in unincorporated Chambers County, serves Winnie and Stowell.

References

External links
  
 
 Winnie Area Chamber of Commerce
 East Chambers ISD
 Gulf Coast Computer Services
 East Chambers Independent School District

Census-designated places in Chambers County, Texas
Census-designated places in Texas
Greater Houston